Štiglic or Štiglić is a surname. Notable people with the surname include:

 France Štiglic (1919–1993), Slovenian film director and screenwriter
 Sanja Štiglic (born 1970), Slovenian diplomat and politician
 Srećko Štiglić (born 1943), Croatian athlete